Tatiana Groshkova (born December 16, 1973) is a retired elite female gymnast who competed for the U.S.S.R. women's artistic gymnastics team from the mid-1980s to the early 1990s.

Beginning at age 6, Groshkova trained under Olympic-gymnast-turned-coach Elvira Saadi at the Moscow Dynamo Club, which is the gym where 2000 Sydney Olympics floor and vault champion Elena Zamolodchikova later trained.

In 1986, Groshkova placed third all-around and earned a share of the U.S.S.R team gold metal at the Junior GDR-USSR Dual Meet.

At the 1989 U.S.S.R. championships, Groshkova placed 3rd in the all-around, and at the 1989 Tokyo Cup she won floor exercise. She placed second on floor and 10th all-around at the 1990 European Championships.  Also in 1990, Groshkova won the all-around at the Trophee Massilia and the Avignon International.

The major skills in her repertoire included a double full in (being one of the only women to ever do this) and double layout on floor; a Comaneci and full-in dismount on uneven bars; and a combination back handspring to full-twisting backflip, along with a full-in dismount on balance beam.

References

1973 births
Living people
Soviet female artistic gymnasts
Dynamo sports society athletes